Shining in the Wood is an extended play by the British band Tiger. Released in the US to good reviews, the EP collects together the title track and its two B-sides from the "Shining in the Wood" UK single and the three B-sides from the "Race" single. The EP was produced by Daren Eskriett and the band-themselves, with the exception of "Honey Friends" which was produced by the band with Louis Jones. The EP was a useful companion to the We Are Puppets studio album, as none of the tracks had previously been released in the US.

"Where's the Love?" and "Bicycle" originally appeared on the "Shining in the Wood" single released June 1996 (Fierce Panda Records).

"Honey Friends", "Time Tunnel Cellar" and "I'm in Love with RAF Nurse" originally appeared on the "Race" single released August 1996 (Trade 2, Island)

Track listing

Personnel
Tiger
Dan Laidler - Vocals, Guitar
Julie Sims - Guitar, Vocals
Tina Whitlow - Keyboards, Guitar
Dido Hallett - Keyboards
Seamus Feeney - Drums

Other personnel
Tiger - producer
Daren Eskriett - producer (all tracks except "Honey Friends")
Louis Jones - producer ("Honey Friends")
Warsaw - Sleeve

References

Tiger (band) albums
1997 EPs